Grammoptera haematites is a species of beetle in the family Cerambycidae. It was described by Newman in 1841.

References

Lepturinae
Beetles described in 1841
Taxa named by Edward Newman